Allan Gauden (20 November 1944 – 29 April 2020) was an English professional footballer who played as a midfielder. He played professionally for Sunderland, Darlington, Grimsby Town, Hartlepool United and Gillingham between 1962 and 1976, and in total made 329 appearances in the Football League, scoring 75 goals.

References

1944 births
2020 deaths
Sportspeople from Ashington
Footballers from Northumberland
English footballers
Association football midfielders
Gillingham F.C. players
Sunderland A.F.C. players
Darlington F.C. players
Grimsby Town F.C. players
Hartlepool United F.C. players
English Football League players